Bülent Eczacıbaşı (born 1949) is a Turkish businessman. Currently, he serves as chairman of the board at Eczacıbaşı Holding, a prominent Turkish conglomerate.

Background

Bülent Eczacıbaşı was born in İstanbul in 1949 to Nejat Eczacıbaşı (1913–1993), founder of the Eczacıbaşı Group of Companies, and his wife Fatma Beyhan (née Ergene) (1923–2004) in Istanbul. He has a younger brother Faruk, who was born in 1954.

Bülent Eczacıbaşı graduated from Imperial College London after his secondary education at the Deutsche Schule Istanbul. He obtained his master's degree in chemical engineering from the Massachusetts Institute of Technology. After initiating his professional career in 1974 at Eczacıbaşı Holding, he held a variety of managerial positions in the Holding's subsidiaries. In 1995, he took on his current position as Chairman of Eczacıbaşı Holding.

Bülent Eczacibasi is married to Oya Esener (born 1959), the daughter of Prof. Turhan Esener, who twice served as Turkey's Labour and Social Security Minister. They have a son, Nejat Emre, and a daughter, Esra, who work at Eczacıbaşı Holding. Both Bülent Eczacıbaşı and Oya Eczacıbaşı are major benefactors to the Istanbul Museum of Modern Art. Oya Eczacıbaşı is Chair of the Museum's board.

Bülent Eczacıbaşı has received French and Italian awards of merit, respectively the “Chevalier dans l'Ordre National de la Légiond'Honneur” and “Commendatore dell'Ordine della Stella d'Italia”. He is the author of "A Rip in the Sea: New Responsibilities for Business" (2020), a book about his experiences in business and the new roles and responsibilities of business leaders. Bülent Eczacıbaşı is also an avid photographer, and in 2020, a selection of photographs he shot during his travels was published under the title "From the Road".

Civic Involvement

Bülent Eczacıbaşı has served at the senior level of prominent business associations, including TÜSIAD, the Turkish Industry and Business Association, where he was Chairman of the Board (1991-1993) and Chairman of the High Advisory Council (1997-2001) and the Turkish Pharmaceuticals Manufacturers Association (İEİS), where he was Chairman of the Board (2000-2008). He continues to serve both TÜSİAD and İEİS as Honorary Chairman. He is also an Honorary Member of the Foreign Economic Relations Board (DEİK) and Turkish Enterprise and Business Confederation (TÜRKONFED), and a member of the High Advisory Council of the Aegean Industry and Business Association (ESİAD).

Additionally, Bülent Eczacıbaşı serves on the board of several major civic organizations. He is Chairman of the Board of Trustees of the Istanbul Modern Art Foundation, Chairman of the Board of Directors of the Istanbul Foundation for Culture and Arts (IKSV), and a member of the High Advisory Board of the Turkish Economic and Social Studies Foundation (TESEV), which he previously served as the Founding Chairman (1993-1997).

References

External links
 Eczacıbaşı Holding official website

Deutsche Schule Istanbul alumni
1949 births
Businesspeople from Istanbul
Alumni of Imperial College London
MIT School of Engineering alumni
Turkish billionaires
Bulent
Museum founders
Living people
Turkish chief executives